Jean-Honoré Fragonard (5 April 1732 – 22 August 1806) was a French painter and printmaker whose late Rococo manner was distinguished by remarkable facility, exuberance, and hedonism. One of the most prolific artists active in the last decades of the Ancien Régime, Fragonard produced more than 550 paintings (not counting drawings and etchings), of which only five are dated. Among his most popular works are genre paintings conveying an atmosphere of intimacy and veiled eroticism.

Biography

Jean-Honoré Fragonard was born at Grasse, Alpes-Maritimes, the son of François Fragonard, a glover, and Françoise Petit.
Fragonard was articled to a Paris notary when his father's circumstances became strained through unsuccessful speculations, but showed such talent and inclination for art that he was taken at the age of eighteen to François Boucher. Boucher recognized the youth's rare gifts but, disinclined to waste his time with one so inexperienced, sent him to Chardin's atelier. Fragonard studied for six months under the great luminist, then returned more fully equipped to Boucher, whose style he soon acquired so completely that the master entrusted him with the execution of replicas of his paintings.

Though not yet a student of the Academy, Fragonard gained the Prix de Rome in 1752 with a painting of Jeroboam Sacrificing to Idols, but before proceeding to Rome he continued to study for three years under Charles-André van Loo. In the year preceding his departure he painted the Christ washing the Feet of the Apostles now at Grasse Cathedral. On 17 September 1756, he took up his abode at the French Academy in Rome, then presided over by Charles-Joseph Natoire.

While at Rome, Fragonard contracted a friendship with a fellow painter, Hubert Robert. In 1760, they toured Italy together, executing numerous sketches of local scenery. It was in these romantic gardens, with their fountains, grottos, temples and terraces, that Fragonard conceived the dreams which he was subsequently to render in his art. He also learned to admire the masters of the Dutch and Flemish schools (Rubens, Hals, Rembrandt, Ruisdael), imitating their loose and vigorous brushstrokes.  Added to this influence was the deep impression made upon his mind by the florid sumptuousness of Giovanni Battista Tiepolo, whose works he had an opportunity to study in Venice before he returned to Paris in 1761.

In 1765 his Coresus et Callirhoe secured his admission to the Academy. It was made the subject of a pompous (though not wholly serious) eulogy by Denis Diderot, and was bought by the king, who had it reproduced at the Gobelins factory. Hitherto Fragonard had hesitated between religious, classic and other subjects; but now the demand of the wealthy art patrons of Louis XV's pleasure-loving and licentious court turned him definitely towards those scenes of love and voluptuousness with which his name will ever be associated, and which are only made acceptable by the tender beauty of his color and the virtuosity of his facile brushwork; such works include the Blind Man's Bluff (Le collin maillard), Serment d'amour (Love Vow), Le Verrou (The Bolt), La Culbute (The Tumble), La Chemise enlevée (The Raised Chemise), and L'escarpolette (The Swing, Wallace Collection), and his decorations for the apartments of Mme du Barry and the dancer Madeleine Guimard. The portrait of Diderot (1769) has recently had its attribution to Fragonard called into question.

A lukewarm response to these series of ambitious works induced Fragonard to abandon Rococo and to experiment with Neoclassicism. He married Marie-Anne Gérard, herself a painter of miniatures, (1745–1823) on 17 June 1769 and had a daughter, Rosalie Fragonard (1769–1788), who became one of his favourite models. In October 1773, he again went to Italy with Pierre-Jacques Onézyme Bergeret de Grancourt and his son, Pierre-Jacques Bergeret de Grancourt. In September 1774, he returned through Vienna, Prague, Dresden, Frankfurt and Strasbourg.

Back in Paris Marguerite Gérard, his wife's 14-year-old sister, became his student and assistant in 1778. In 1780, he had a son, Alexandre-Évariste Fragonard (1780–1850), who eventually became a talented painter and sculptor. The French Revolution deprived Fragonard of his private patrons: they were either guillotined or exiled. The neglected painter deemed it prudent to leave Paris in 1790 and found shelter in the house of his cousin Alexandre Maubert at Grasse, which he decorated with the series of decorative panels known as the Les progrès de l'amour dans le cœur d'une jeune fille, originally painted for Château du Barry.

Fragonard returned to Paris early in the nineteenth century, where he died in 1806, almost completely forgotten.

Reputation 
For half a century or more Fragonard was so completely ignored that Wilhelm Lübke's 1873 art history volume omits mention of his name. Later re-evaluations have re-identified his position among the all-time masters of French painting. The influence of his handling of local colour and expressive, confident brushstroke on the Impressionists (particularly his grand niece, Berthe Morisot, and Renoir) is undoubtable. Fragonard's paintings, alongside those of François Boucher, seem to sum up an era.

One of Fragonard's most renowned paintings is The Swing, also known as The Happy Accidents of the Swing (its original title), an oil painting in the Wallace Collection in London. It is considered to be one of the masterpieces of the rococo era, and is Fragonard's best known work.  The painting portrays a young gentleman concealed in the bushes, observing a lady on swing being pushed by her spouse, who is standing in the background, hidden in the shadows, as he is unaware of the affair.  As the lady swings forward, the young man gets a glimpse under her dress. 
According to Charles Collé's memoirs a young nobleman had requested this portrait of his mistress seated on a swing. He asked first Gabriel François Doyen to make this painting of him and his mistress. Not comfortable with this frivolous work, Doyen refused and passed on the commission to Fragonard.

Works

Recent exhibitions 
 Consuming Passion : Fragonard's Allegories of Love  – Sterling and Francine Clark Art Institute, Williamstown, MA, from 28 October 2007 to 21 January 2008.
 Fragonard – Jacquemart-André Museum, Paris, from 3 October 2007 to 13 January 2008.
 Fragonard. Origines et influences. De Rembrandt au XXIe siècle  – Caixa Forum, Barcelona, from 10 November 2006 to 11 February 2007.
 Les Fragonard de Besançon, Musée des Beaux-Arts et d'archéologie de Besançon, from 8 December 2006 to 2 April 2007: Official website
 Jean-Honoré Fragonard, dessins du Louvre, Musée du Louvre, Paris, from 3 December 2003 to 8 March 2004.
 Fragonard amoureux, Musée du Luxembourg, Paris, from 16 September 2015 to 24 January 2016: Official website
 Fragonard’s Enterprise: The Artist and the Literature of Travel – Norton Simon Museum, Pasadena, from 17 September 2015 to 4 January 2016.

See also
Honoré Fragonard
History of painting
Western painting
Jeroboam Sacrificing to Idols

References and sources

References

Sources
Books

Articles and webpages

Further reading

 
Milton W. Brown, George R. Collins, Beatrice Farwell, Jane G. Mahler and Margaretta Salinger, "Jean-Honoré Fragonard" in Encyclopedia of Painting: Painters and Paintings of the World from Prehistoric Times to the Present Day, Myers S. Bernard (ed), Crown, 1955. pp182–83.

External links

Web Gallery of Art: Jean-Honoré Fragonard
Fragonard's Biography, Style and Artworks
Olga's Gallery
Jean-Honoré Fragonard's Cats
Biography at Project Gutenberg

Fragonard works at the National Gallery of Art
Jean-Honoré Fragonard

 
1732 births
1806 deaths
People from Grasse
18th-century French painters
French male painters
19th-century French painters
French printmakers
Rococo painters
Prix de Rome for painting
École des Beaux-Arts alumni
18th-century French male artists